Adgandestrius (fl. 1st century AD) was a chief of the ancient Germanic tribe of the Chatti.  He offered to kill Arminius if the Romans would send him poison for the purpose; but Tiberius declined the offer.

References

1st-century people
1st-century Germanic people
Germanic warriors
Chatti